Hossein Mesgar Saravi (born March 21, 1957 in Qaemshahr) is a retired player and current coach of Iranian football. He wore the Iran national football team shirts during the years 2 and 4 while coaching the late Parviz Dehdari, Asgarzadeh, Ebrahimi and Reza Vatankhah. He was involved in nine national games and tied the captain's armband.

References

External links

1957 births
Living people
Iranian footballers
Iran international footballers
Association football defenders
People from Qaem Shahr
F.C. Nassaji Mazandaran managers
Sportspeople from Mazandaran province